Paran Parviz (also Romanized as Parān Parvīz; also known as Eslāmābād-e Yarān Parvīz) is a village in Malavi Rural District, in the Central District of Pol-e Dokhtar County, Lorestan Province, Iran. At the 2006 census, its population was 996, in 213 families.

References 

Towns and villages in Pol-e Dokhtar County